Women in Cellblock 9 is a 1977 Swiss exploitation action horror film written and directed by Jess Franco and starring Karine Gambier. Its main theme is women in prison.

Unlike most of Franco's work, the film remains banned in the United Kingdom due to large amounts of sexual violence and because one of the lead actresses in many of the sex scenes, Susan Hemingway, was 16 at the time the film was made. The film was rejected by the British Board of Film Classification when submitted in 2004 and has since not been successfully appealed.

Plot
The film is set in a South American jungle prison during a revolution. Initially, the camp commander and the prison physician, Dr. Costa, wait for a few guards on a truck. On board are six young women. Three of them were arrested on suspicion of revolutionary activities, the other three are made available to the guards to be raped. The three detainees, Karine, Barbara, and Aida, are found shortly thereafter, naked and chained in a standing position, in the notorious Cellblock 9. Gradually, they are presented to the "interrogation", which is supported by the doctor through various tortures. Barbara and Aida resist the torture and remain silent, Karine, however, breaks down under the torture, and some revolutionaries denounced the (unnamed) city.

In the meantime, the young indigenous student Marie also ends up in the cellblock. Allegedly, propaganda material was found on her by the insurgents. Their torture was to spend three days without food and water in a single cell. She was then taken to dinner with the commander of the doctor, where they have oral sex in order to then get a little sip of salty Champagne.

After the four women in Cellblock 9 again are forging among themselves, they devise a plan to contact their contacts in the capital. The quartet manages to distract the guard in order to knock him out and flee with his rifle. Shortly after leaving the cellblock, Aida is killed in a gunfight with another guard who is also killed. The other three flee into the jungle, where Barbara has been shot and they progress slowly. They make it to an old temple, where they feel safe and remove the bullet from Barbara's shoulder. Karine and Marie go into the jungle to look for food, but the guards find their trail and meet them at the temple. As Barbara is killed, the other two, alerted by her screams, run back to the temple and are suddenly confronted by the camp commander and the doctor (surrounded by prison guards). In a last desperate action Karine attempts to steal the commander's pistol. When she fails to pull the trigger, the commander gives the order to fire and the last two prisoners are struck down on the spot. With the desecration of the corpses, the film ends.

Cast

Release
The film was first released in West Germany on 17 March 1978. In addition to its original title, the film is also known as Escape from the Island of Death. In English-speaking countries it is also known as Tropical Inferno and Women in Cellblock 9.

References

External links
 
 

1977 films
1970s English-language films
English-language Swiss films
1977 horror films
1970s action drama films
1970s crime drama films
1977 LGBT-related films
Swiss drama films
Swiss horror films
Swiss LGBT-related films
Films directed by Jesús Franco
Films set in South America
Lesbian-related films
1970s prison films
Women in prison films
1970s exploitation films
1977 drama films
1978 drama films
1978 films
Films originally rejected by the British Board of Film Classification